Ethel Kremer Schwabacher (born May 20, 1903, New York, New York, U.S.— died November 25, 1984, New York, New York, U.S.) was an abstract expressionist painter, represented by the Betty Parsons Gallery in the 1950s and 1960s. She was a protégé and first biographer of Arshile Gorky, and friends with many of the prominent painters of New York at that time, including Willem de Kooning, Richard Pousette-Dart, Kenzo Okada, and José Guerrero. She was also the author of a monograph on the artist John Ford and a memoir, "Hungry for Light".

Biography
Schwabacher was born in New York in 1903. Her family moved to Pelham in 1908 where she first began painting in her garden.  She attended Horace Mann School and at age 15 enrolled at the Art Students League of New York.  She also studied sculpture at the National Academy of Design until 1921.   During 1921, Arnold Genthe took several photographs of her.  After her apprenticeship in stone carving with the sculptor Anna Hyatt Huntington, in 1927  Schwabacher abandoned sculpture and enrolled in Max Weber's painting class at the Art Students League. That year she met Arshile Gorky, with whom she developed a lasting friendship.

She lived in Europe from 1928 to 1934.  She and Gorky took independent studies together between 1934 and 1936.  Gorky introduced her to automatism. She was inspired by Gorky's biomorphic abstractions and erotic forms. In the 1930s she began to explore her own sub-conscious, combining automatism with abstract forms, referring to nature. Schwabacher often interconnected themes of womanhood, childbirth, and children.

In 1934, she married the prominent entertainment lawyer Wolf Schwabacher and had two children: Brenda Webster, American critic and novelist; and Christopher Schwabacher a lawyer in New York. Her cousin George Oppen, an objectivist poet who went on to win the Pulitzer Prize, also lived in New York in the 1930s.

Following the untimely death of her husband, she expressed her personal traumas through the a series of figurative paintings based on Greek myths. She died on November 25, 1984.

Schwabacher's work is included in the collections of The Metropolitan Museum of Art, the Whitney Museum of American Art, the Solomon R. Guggenheim Museum, the Jewish Museum, the Brooklyn Museum of Art, and the Rockefeller University in New York City. Her work has been exhibited in a number of galleries, including the Anita Shapolsky Gallery, the Betty Parsons Gallery and the Green-Ross Gallery in New York City.

Her work was featured in "Women of Abstract Expressionism" at the Denver Art Museum from June–September, 2016, and at the Palm Springs Art Museum in 2017.

Gendered Themes 
Much like her female abstract expressionist contemporary Lee Krasner, whose work was cast in her husband’s shadow until his death, Schwabacher’s work stands as an example of gender politics in art as her works are continually attributed her role as a woman, wife, and mother. Her allusion to Greek themes and myths in the Odes series are said to have been influenced by the death of her husband, but this assertion fails to consider her interest in the Surrealism movement. She uses loose brushstrokes and bold colors to explore themes central to the abstract expressionist movement — Freudian psychology, dream states, and the unconscious.

See also
 Bodley Gallery

References

 "Ethel Schwabacher: The Lyric/Epic and the Personal", Judith E. Johnson, Jayne L. Walker, Brenda S. Webster, Woman's Art Journal, Vol. 10, No. 1 (Spring – Summer, 1989), pp. 3–9
 Arshile Gorky by Ethel Kremer Schwabacher (New York: Macmillan, 1957)
 Schwabacher, Ethel;  Jeanne Reynal;  Bodley Gallery (New York, N.Y.) Of people : Ethel Schwabacher, pastels : Jeanne Reynal, mosaics. (New York : Bodley Gallery, 1976) OCLC: 48706042
 Hungry For Light: The Journal of Ethel Schwabacher, edited by Brenda S. Webster and Judith Emylyn Johnson (Bloomington, IN: Indiana University Press, 1993)
 Marika Herskovic, American Abstract and Figurative Expressionism: Style Is Timely Art Is Timeless (New York School Press, 2009.) . p. 216–219

1903 births
1984 deaths
Art Students League of New York alumni
American women painters
People from Pelham, New York
20th-century American painters
20th-century American women artists